Pervez Iqbal (26 December 1975 – 11 March 2002) was a Pakistani cricketer.  Iqbal was a left-handed batsman who bowled with his right-arm medium pace.  He was born at Rawalpindi, Punjab.

Iqbal made his first-class debut for Rawalpindi against Faisalabad in 1993/94 season.  Iqbal represented the main Rawalpindi team in first-class cricket from the 1993/94 to 2000/01, as well as Rawalpindi B from 1994/95-1995/96.  His final first-class match came for the main Rawalpindi team against Lahore Blues in 2001.  In total, from 1993/94 to 2000/01 he played 20 first-class matches.  In these matches he scored a total of 602 runs at a batting average of 20.06, with 4 half centuries and a high score of 76.  With the ball he took 46 wickets at a bowling average of 25.71, with a single five wicket haul which resulted in his best figures of 5/59.

Iqbal also made his debut in List A cricket for Rawalpindi in the 1993/94 season against Faisalabad.  Iqbal represented the main Rawalpindi team in List A cricket 11 times from the 1993/94 to 1999/2000 season.  In addition, he also represented Rawalpindi A in 8 matches during the 1995/96 season.  His final List-A match for a Rawalpindi team came against Islamabad in March 2000.  During the 2000 English cricket season, Iqbal played a single List A match for the Derbyshire Cricket Board in the 2000 NatWest Trophy against the Gloucestershire Cricket Board.  In his total of 20 List A matches, he scored 212 runs at an average of 15.14, with a single half century high score of 56.  With the ball he took 25 wickets at an average of 22.32, with a single five wicket haul which gave him best figures of 5/22.

Iqbal died in Rawalpindi, Punjab on 11 March 2002 from a rare pollen allergy.

References

External links
Pervez Iqbal at ESPNcricinfo
Pervez Iqbal at CricketArchive

1975 births
2002 deaths
Cricketers from Rawalpindi
Pakistani cricketers
Rawalpindi cricketers
Derbyshire Cricket Board cricketers
Respiratory disease deaths in Pakistan
Rawalpindi B cricketers